FC Yadro Saint Petersburg is a Russian football team based in Saint Petersburg. It was founded in 2019.

Club history
The club was formed in 2019 and played in local amateur competitions. It received a professional license for the 2022–23 season of the Russian Second League.

Current squad
As of 22 February 2023, according to the Second League website.

References

Association football clubs established in 2019
Football clubs in Russia
Football clubs in Saint Petersburg
2019 establishments in Russia